The 2020 Atlantic hurricane season was the most active Atlantic hurricane season on record in terms of number of named storms. Additionally, it was as an above-average season for tropical cyclones for the fifth consecutive year. The season officially began on June 1, 2020, and ended on November 30, 2020. These dates, adopted by convention, historically delimit the period each year when most Atlantic tropical systems form. However, storm formation is possible at any time of the year, as was the case this season, when its first two named storms, Tropical Storm Arthur and Tropical Storm Bertha, formed on May 16 and May 27, respectively. The final storm, Hurricane Iota, dissipated on November 18.

Altogether, the season produced 31 tropical or subtropical cyclones, all but one of which became a named storm. Of the 30 named storms, 14 became hurricanes, and seven further intensified into major hurricanes. It was the second and final season to use the Greek letter storm naming system, the first being 2005. The storm was responsible for 81 deaths and it caused over US$19 billion in damage across the Greater Antilles and the Southern United States. Causing significant late-season loss of life and widespread destruction were November hurricanes Eta and Iota, which made landfall in Central America as Category 4 storms just two weeks apart. The storms left a toll of 184 deaths and 110 missing across the region, and thousands of families lost their homes and livelihoods. In March 2021, the names Laura, Eta and Iota were retired from reuse in the North Atlantic by the World Meteorological Organization due to the extraordinary amount of damage and number of fatalities they caused.

This timeline documents tropical cyclone formations, strengthening, weakening, landfalls, extratropical transitions, and dissipations during the season. It includes information that was not released throughout the season, meaning that data from post-storm reviews by the National Hurricane Center, such as a storm that was not initially warned upon, has been included.

By convention, meteorologists use one time zone when issuing forecasts and making observations: Coordinated Universal Time (UTC), and also use the 24-hour clock (where 00:00 = midnight UTC). The National Hurricane Center uses both UTC and the time zone where the center of the tropical cyclone is currently located. The time zones utilized (east to west) are: Greenwich, Cape Verde, Atlantic, Eastern, and Central. In this timeline, all information is listed by UTC first, with the respective regional time zone included in parentheses. Additionally, figures for maximum sustained winds and position estimates are rounded to the nearest 5 units (knots, miles, or kilometers), following National Hurricane Center practice. Direct wind observations are rounded to the nearest whole number. Atmospheric pressures are listed to the nearest millibar and nearest hundredth of an inch of mercury.

Timeline

May

May 16
18:00 UTC (2:00 p.m.

May 17
00:00 UTC (8:00 p.m.

May 19

06:00 UTC (2:00 a.m.
12:00 UTC (8:00 a.m.

May 27
06:00 UTC (2:00 a.m.
12:00 UTC (8:00 a.m.
13:30 UTC (9:30 a.m.
18:00 UTC (2:00 p.m.

May 28
06:00 UTC (2:00 a.m.

June

June 1
The 2020 Atlantic hurricane season officially begins.
18:00 UTC (1:00 p.m.

June 2
12:00 UTC (7:00 a.m.

June 3

13:00 UTC (8:00 a.m.

June 4
12:00 UTC (7:00 a.m.

June 5
06:00 UTC (1:00 a.m.

June 6
00:00 UTC (7:00 p.m.

June 7
22:00 UTC (5:00 p.m.

June 8
12:00 UTC (7:00 a.m.

June 9
18:00 UTC (1:00 p.m.

June 10
00:00 UTC (7:00 p.m.

June 22
12:00 UTC (8:00 a.m.

June 23
06:00 UTC (2:00 a.m.
12:00 UTC (8:00 a.m.

June 24
06:00 UTC (2:00 a.m.

July

July 4
12:00 UTC (8:00 a.m.

July 6
00:00 UTC (8:00 p.m.
18:00 UTC (2:00 p.m.

July 7
00:00 UTC (8:00 p.m.

July 9
18:00 UTC (2:00 p.m.
July 10

18:00 UTC (2:00 p.m.
20:00 UTC (4:00 p.m.

July 11
06:00 UTC (2:00 a.m.

July 21
18:00 UTC (2:00 p.m.

July 22
06:00 UTC (2:00 a.m.

July 23
00:00 UTC (7:00 p.m.
06:00 UTC (2:00 a.m.

July 24
00:00 UTC (7:00 p.m.

July 25

12:00 UTC (7:00 a.m.
15:30 UTC (11:30 a.m. AST) at Tropical Storm Gonzalo weakens to a tropical depression just before making landfall along the eastern coast of Trinidad, near Manzanilla Beach, and later degenerates into an open trough.
18:00 UTC (1:00 p.m.
22:00 UTC (5:00 p.m.
23:15 UTC (6:15 p.m.

July 26
06:00 UTC (1:00 a.m.
18:00 UTC (1:00 p.m.

July 30
00:00 UTC (8:00 p.m.
16:15 UTC (12:15 p.m.

July 31
00:00 UTC (8:00 p.m.
09:00 UTC (5:00 a.m.
18:00 UTC (8:00 p.m.

August

August 1

 13:00 UTC (9:00 a.m.
18:00 UTC (2:00 p.m.

August 2
 00:00 UTC (11:00 p.m.

August 3
18:00 UTC (2:00 p.m.

August 4
00:00 UTC (8:00 p.m.
03:10 UTC (11:10 p.m.
06:00 UTC (2:00 a.m.

August 5
 00:00 UTC (8:00 p.m.

August 11
06:00 UTC (2:00 a.m.

August 13
12:00 UTC (8:00 a.m.

August 14
12:00 UTC (8:00 a.m.
18:00 UTC (2:00 p.m.

August 15
12:00 UTC (2:00 a.m.

August 16
06:00 UTC (2:00 a.m.

August 20

August 21
06:00 UTC (2:00 a.m.
12:00 UTC (8:00 a.m.
20:30 UTC (4:30 p.m.
23:30 UTC (7:30 p.m.

August 22
00:00 UTC (8:00 p.m.

August 23

04:30 UTC (12:30 a.m.
12:00 UTC (7:00 a.m.

August 24
00:00 UTC (7:00 p.m.
02:00 UTC (10:00 p.m.

August 25
00:00 UTC (8:00 p.m.
00:00 UTC (7:00 p.m.
06:00 UTC (1:00 a.m.
12:00 UTC (8:00 a.m.

August 26
06:00 UTC (1:00 a.m.
12:00 UTC (7:00 a.m.
18:00 UTC (1:00 p.m.

August 27
00:00 UTC (7:00 p.m.
06:00 UTC (1:00 a.m.
09:00 UTC (4:00 a.m.
10:00 UTC (5:00 a.m.
14:00 UTC (9:00 a.m.
17:00 UTC (12:00 p.m.

August 28
06:00 UTC (1:00 a.m.

August 29
06:00 UTC (2:00 a.m.

August 31
12:00 UTC (8:00 a.m.

September

September 1
06:00 UTC (2:00 a.m.
12:00 UTC (8:00 a.m.

September 3

00:00 UTC (8:00 p.m.
03:00 UTC (10:00 p.m.
06:00 UTC (1:00 a.m.
12:00 UTC (7:00 a.m.
18:00 UTC (1:00 p.m.

September 4

September 5
18:00 UTC (2:00 p.m.

September 7

00:00 UTC (8:00 p.m.
06:00 UTC (5:00 a.m.
12:00 UTC (8:00 a.m.
18:00 UTC (5:00 p.m.

September 8
18:00 UTC (5:00 p.m.

September 9
12:00 UTC (8:00 a.m.

September 10
12:00 UTC (8:00 a.m.

September 11
18:00 UTC (2:00 p.m.

September 12
06:00 UTC (2:00 a.m.
06:00 UTC (2:00 a.m.
12:00 UTC (8:00 a.m.
12:00 UTC (8:00 a.m.

September 13
00:00 UTC (8:00 p.m.

September 14

00:00 UTC (8:00 p.m.
00:00 UTC (11:00 p.m.
06:00 UTC (1:00 a.m.
06:00 UTC (5:00 a.m.
08:50 UTC (4:50 a.m.
15:00 UTC (11:00 a.m.
18:00 UTC (2:00 p.m.

September 15
12:00 UTC (8:00 a.m.

September 16
00:00 UTC (8:00 p.m.
06:00 UTC (2:00 a.m.
06:00 UTC (1:00 a.m. CDT) at Hurricane Sally intensifies to a Category 2 hurricane as its northern eyewall begins moving onshore at Baldwin County, Alabama.
09:45 UTC (4:45 a.m.
12:00 UTC (8:00 a.m.
12:00 UTC (8:00 a.m.
18:00 UTC (1:00 p.m.

September 17
06:00 UTC (1:00 a.m.
06:00 UTC (6:00 a.m.
12:00 UTC (7:00 a.m. CDT) at Tropical Depression Sally becomes an extratropical low over eastern Alabama, and is subsequently absorbed within a cold front.
12:00 UTC (8:00 a.m.
12:00 UTC (8:00 a.m.
12:00 UTC (7:00 a.m.
18:00 UTC (2:00 p.m.
18:00 UTC (2:00 p.m.
18:00 UTC (2:00 p.m.

September 18
00:00 UTC (8:00 p.m.
00:00 UTC (12:00 a.m.
00:00 UTC (8:00 p.m.
12:00 UTC (8:00 a.m.
18:00 UTC (1:00 p.m.
18:40 UTC (6:40 p.m.

September 19
00:00 UTC (12:00 a.m.
06:00 UTC (2:00 a.m.

September 20
00:00 UTC (8:00 p.m.
12:00 UTC (7:00 a.m.
12:00 UTC (8:00 a.m.
18:00 UTC (6:00 p.m.
18:00 UTC (2:00 p.m.

September 21
00:00 UTC (7:00 p.m.
00:00 UTC (8:00 p.m.

September 22
00:00 UTC (12:00 a.m.
00:00 UTC (8:00 p.m.
02:45 UTC (9:45 p.m. CDT, September 21) at Tropical Storm Beta makes landfall over the southern end of the Matagorda Peninsula, near Port O'Connor, Texas, with maximum sustained winds near .
12:00 UTC (12:00 p.m.
12:00 UTC (8:00 a.m.
18:00 UTC (2:00 p.m.
18:00 UTC (1:00 p.m.

September 23
00:00 UTC (8:00 p.m.
00:00 UTC (7:00 p.m.

October

October 2

06:00 UTC (2:00 a.m.
18:00 UTC (2:00 p.m.

October 3
16:45 UTC (11:45 a.m.
18:00 UTC (1:00 p.m.

October 4
06:00 UTC (1:00 a.m.
18:00 UTC (1:00 p.m.
18:00 UTC (2:00 p.m.

October 5
12:00 UTC (8:00 a.m.
18:00 UTC (1:00 p.m.

October 6
00:00 UTC (8:00 p.m.
03:00 UTC (10:00 p.m. CDT, October 5) at Tropical Depression Gamma makes landfall near San Felipe, Yucatán, and its circulation later dissipates over the Yucatán Peninsula.
12:00 UTC (8:00 a.m. EDT) at Hurricane Delta strengthens to Category 3 intensity about 270 mi ( west of Montego Bay.
18:00 UTC (1:00 p.m.

October 7
06:00 UTC (1:00 a.m.
10:30 UTC (5:30 a.m.
18:00 UTC (1:00 p.m.

October 8

06:00 UTC (1:00 a.m.
18:00 UTC (1:00 p.m.

October 9
00:00 UTC (7:00 p.m.
18:00 UTC (1:00 p.m.
23:00 UTC (6:00 p.m.

October 10
00:00 UTC (7:00 p.m. CDT, October 9) at Hurricane Delta weakens to Category 1 strength inland, about 15 ;mi (25 km) north-northeast of Creole.
06:00 UTC (1:00 a.m.
18:00 UTC (1:00 p.m.

October 19
06:00 UTC (2:00 a.m.
12:00 UTC (8:00 a.m.

October 21
00:00 UTC (8:00 p.m.
12:00 UTC (8:00 a.m.
18:00 UTC (2:00 p.m.

October 22
00:00 UTC (8:00 p.m.
06:00 UTC (2:00 a.m.
12:00 UTC (8:00 a.m.

October 24
12:00 UTC (8:00 a.m.

October 25
00:00 UTC (8:00 p.m.
18:00 UTC (2:00 p.m. AST) at Hurricane Epsilon weakens to tropical storm strength about ( southeast of Cape Race, Newfoundland.

October 26
06:00 UTC (6:00 a.m.
06:00 UTC (2:00 a.m.

October 27
03:55 UTC (10:55 p.m.
12:00 UTC (7:00 a.m.

October 28
06:00 UTC (1:00 a.m.
18:00 UTC (1:00 p.m.
21:00 UTC (4:00 p.m.

October 29
00:00 UTC (7:00 p.m.
06:00 UTC (1:00 a.m.
18:00 UTC (2:00 p.m. EDT) at Tropical Storm Zeta transitions into a post-tropical cyclone over central Virginia, and later dissipates.

October 31
18:00 UTC (2:00 p.m.

November

November 1
00:00 UTC (8:00 p.m.

November 2
06:00 UTC (1:00 a.m.
12:00 UTC (7:00 a.m.
15:00 UTC (10:00 a.m.
18:00 UTC (1:00 p.m.

November 3

00:00 UTC (7:00 p.m.
06:00 UTC (1:00 a.m.
21:00 UTC (4:00 p.m.

November 4
00:00 UTC (7:00 p.m.
12:00 UTC (7:00 a.m.

November 5
00:00 UTC (6:00 p.m.
06:00 UTC (12:00 a.m.

November 6
00:00 UTC (6:00 p.m.
06:00 UTC (12:00 a.m.

November 7
06:00 UTC (12:00 a.m.

November 8
09:00 UTC (4:00 a.m.
15:00 UTC (10:00 a.m.

November 9
04:00 UTC (11:00 p.m.

November 10
00:00 UTC (12:00 a.m.
12:00 UTC (12:00 p.m.
18:00 UTC (6:00 p.m.

November 11
12:00 UTC (7:00 a.m.
18:00 UTC (1:00 p.m.

November 12
09:00 UTC (4:00 a.m.
18:00 UTC (1:00 p.m.

November 13
09:00 UTC (4:00 a.m.
12:00 UTC (7:00 a.m.
18:00 UTC (1:00 p.m.

November 15
06:00 UTC (6:00 a.m.
06:00 UTC (1:00 a.m.
12:00 UTC (12:00 p.m.

November 16

00:00 UTC (7:00 p.m.
06:00 UTC (1:00 a.m.
12:00 UTC (7:00 a.m.

November 17
03:40 UTC (10:40 p.m.
06:00 UTC (1:00 a.m.
12:00 UTC (7:00 a.m.
18:00 UTC (12:00 p.m.

November 18
12:00 UTC (6:00 a.m.

November 30
The 2020 Atlantic hurricane season officially ends.

See also

 Lists of Atlantic hurricanes
 Timeline of the 2020 Pacific hurricane season

Notes

References

External links

 2020 Tropical Cyclone Advisory Archive, National Hurricane Center and Central Pacific Hurricane Center
 Hurricanes and Tropical Storms – Annual 2020, National Centers for Environmental Information

 
2020
Articles which contain graphical timelines